Neville Gruzman, AM (1925 – 1 May 2005) was an Australian architect, mayor of Woollahra, writer and architectural activist. He is considered to have exerted a decisive influence on Sydney's architecture, mostly through his dedication to designing architecture that reacts to the landscape and to the needs of the client.

Life 

Gruzman was born in Sydney, Australia. His parents—Sam Gruzman and Rosalind Gunzburg—were of Russian origin. He was the middle son, with Laurence, the eldest and Des, the youngest. His childhood near Cooper Park, Bellevue Hill, exerted a certain influence on him regarding his attitude towards landscape. He initially intended to fulfill his mother's wish to study medicine but enrolled for architecture after graduating from Sydney Boys High School.

In the late 1940s he entered the University of Sydney, where Beaux Arts was a main subject. The first three years of his studyings were difficult for him as he wasn't good in drawing. However, he profited from his work experiences. He developed an interest in ballrooms, particularly mirrors and reflections, and won some skills with glamorous decoration from an interior decorator, Margaret Jaye. In his fourth year at university, he was attracted to the European Modernists, who influenced and furthered him. Before he graduated, he designed the Lapin House, Rose Bay for his aunt. He graduated in 1952 and traveled to Europe with other graduates. Returning to Australia, he opened an office with Bill and Ruth Lucas. He read the work Architectural Beauty in Japan and was deeply attracted by wafer thin concrete roofs, screen glazing and floating upstands sitting over the garden. Therefore, he traveled to Japan for a four-and-a-half-months studying visit—a journey that would be followed by numerous others to the country. Later, Gruzman was amazed by the work of Frank Lloyd Wright. His understanding of the aspects of planning and of the necessities of an ongoing development grew decisively, in this period. In about 1967, he devoted himself to teaching; he is reported to have reassured his students attended the classes, regularly, and to have renounced holidays to provide extra tutorials for his students. He also participated in politics, to improve the quality of built environment.

Gruzman had poor health. He suffered from asthma and heart attacks but managed to recover. He also had an accident that led to brain surgery causing the loss of most of his memory, including for details such as door dimensions, which he most attentively relearned.

Architecture
Gruzman mostly built residential houses in Sydney. His works are varied forms of Modernism known as Organic Modernism, or Regionalism; some show a strong influence by the works of Frank Lloyd Wright. The impressions exerted on him on his trips to Japan—mainly by the traditional post and beam architecture he saw at places like Katsura Imperial Villa—influenced some of the homes he created and into which he eventually included Japanese elements (Goodman House, Middle Cove). In the 1960s Gruzman gained recognition for private homes built for wealthy and sometimes eccentric clients along Sydney's north shore, such as the Hill's House (1966), designed for a nudist and the "theatrical" Holland House (1962), built for an actress, who would both delight and scare her guests by dancing on the house's rail-less balcony hanging over a cliff-face. His work has been described as "major gestures, very Hollywood glamour."

Gruzman's architectural principles included maximum exposure to sunlight and privacy visually and audibly.

Gruzman is loosely connected to the "Sydney School" of architects of the 1950s and 1960s—a movement that started in opposition to the International Style of modernism supported by other Australian architects and that has recently been re-discovered by home buyers and architectural fans, leading to a trend to preserve the homes from the period. However, Gruzman's work deviates from the Sydney School style in important traits; Gruzman himself denied a connection to the movement.

Notable projects

Hills House, Turramurra, New South Wales (1966, 1983)

Original client was Sam Rosenburg, a nudist and vegetarian. Gruzman's idea was to build a series of hills that surround the site on three sides making it visually and acoustically private. Later, expansion was added for new clients, a family with three children. The building is referred to by Philip Goad as a product of two iconic 20th-century houses (Wright's Fallingwater and Mies van der Rohe's Farnsworth House) that created the ultimate diagram of abstract shelter in the landscape.

Gruzman House, Darling Point, New South Wales (1958, 1965, 1995)

Gruzman's own house is a hidden sanctuary, entirely private and distant from noise (Philip Goad). The living area was joyous, with its classical organic interior embellished with a collection of paintings, sculpture, and porcelain. Jørn Utzon has judged that the house possessed the best living room in Australia. Another focus point is Gruzman's wife's dressing room with infinite light reflections from the mirrors on the walls on all four sides and on the ceiling.

Goodman House, Middle Cove, New South Wales (1956–57, 1983)

Designed for a couple soon after Gruzman's Japan trip, ideas of traditional Japanese architecture are infused in the design. Such as the entry to the pagoda-like end of the house and a sweeping curved roof suspended by cables. It is one of the early houses in Sydney to use materials such as dark stained timbers and natural brick.

Other projects
Drumalbyn Road, Bellevue Hill (1960's?)
Lapin House, Rose Bay, New South Wales (1949–52)
Montrose Apartments, Neutral Bay, New South Wales (1954–55)
Purnell Motors Pty Ltd, Arncliffe, New South Wales (1955)
Riedl House, Bellevue Hill (1955-1956)
South Head Synagogue, Rose Bay, New South Wales (1957)
Benjamin House, Longueville, New South Wales (1959)
Salz House, Mosman, New South Wales (1960)
Fogl Medical Centre, Gladesville, New South Wales (1961)
Holland House, Middle Cove, New South Wales (1961)
Les Girls, Kings Cross, New South Wales (1961)
Lend Lease Corporation Houses, Carlingford, New South Wales (1961–62)
Long House, Dolls Point, New South Wales (1962–1964)
Rudy Komon Art Gallery, Paddington, New South Wales (1963–64)
Probert House, St Ives, New South Wales (1957–58, 1966)
Gregory & Carr Funeral Chapel, Mona Vale, New South Wales (1968)
Gaden House, Double Bay, New South Wales (1968)
Gowing House, Castlecrag, New South Wales (1969)
Healey House, Hunters Hill, New South Wales (1972)
McHollick House, Paddington, New South Wales (1974)
Chadwick House, Forestville, New South Wales (1961–64, 1968, 1976)
Wellman House, Forestville, New South Wales (1962)
Thorpe House, Palm Beach, New South Wales (1978)
Hamilton House, Bilgola Beach, New South Wales (1979)

Political career

In the 1980s Gruzman joined the Anti-Wall Committee formed to protect the Sydney Opera House from nearby urban development. In 1997 he chaired the renamed "Save East Circular Quay Committee".

In the 1990s Gruzman became politically active and was elected first as a councilor and then mayor of Woollahra, on a platform of responsible urban development. He was a critic of urban planning in Sydney, and also Sydney architects, notably Harry Seidler. Both his architectural criticism and time as mayor were controversial.

Career as a teacher
Gruzman began teaching at the University of New South Wales in the 1960s with a number of contemporary modernist architects such as Bill Lucas and Harry Howard. He became an Adjunct Professor and, as a critic of shortening teaching hours and increasing class size, was known for using Saturdays and public holidays to give extra classes to his students at his own home. In 2002 he established two student awards at the Faculty of the Built Environment, both for the best use of urban design in architecture. In his studio practise, beginning from the 1950s, he also employed and trained many notable Sydney architects, including Pritzker Prize winner Glenn Murcutt.

Portrait and memoirs
In 1970, Gruzman was the subject of the winning entry for the Archibald Prize, painted by Eric Smith. Gruzman sat for Smith several times, and commissioned Smith to contribute mosaics and stained glass for buildings he designed, including the South Head and District Synagogue in Rose Bay, as well as paintings Smith produced for the houses of his clients.

Most of Gruzman's houses were photographed by Max Dupain and David Moore.

Gruzman's memoirs, incorporated into a book written by Philip Goad and featuring many of the Dupain and Moore photographs, was published posthumously in 2006 by Thames & Hudson.

Honours 
Gruzman was appointed a Member of the Order of Australia (AM) in the 1985 Australia Day Honours.

The Margot and Neville Gruzman Award for Urban Design in Architecture was named after Gruzman due to his commitment in teaching at the University of New South Wales.

References

External links
Gallery of Selected Works
Obituary, Architecture Australia

1925 births
2005 deaths
Australian people of Russian descent
New South Wales architects
Modernist architects
20th-century Australian architects
Organic architecture
Members of the Order of Australia
Mayors of Woollahra